The 2000 West Coast Conference men's basketball tournament took place March 4–6, 2000. All rounds were held in Santa Clara, California at the Toso Pavilion. The semifinals were televised by ESPN2. The West Coast Conference Championship Game was televised by ESPN.

The Gonzaga Bulldogs earned their second straight WCC Tournament title and an automatic bid to the 2000 NCAA tournament. Casey Calvary of Gonzaga was named Tournament MVP.

Format
With eight teams participating, all eight teams were placed into the first round, with teams seeded and paired based on regular-season records. After the first round, teams were re-seeded so the highest-remaining team was paired with the lowest-remaining time in one semifinal with the other two teams slotted into the other semifinal.

Bracket
* – Denotes overtime period

See also 
West Coast Conference

References

Tournament
West Coast Conference men's basketball tournament
West Coast Athletic Conference men's basketball tournament
West Coast Athletic Conference men's basketball tournament